Marina Petrovna Chepurkova (born 10 August 1980) is a Russian freestyle swimmer. She competed at the 2000 Summer Olympics in the 4×100 m freestyle relay and finished in 10th place.

References

External links
Marina TCHEPOURKOVA. les-sports.info
Maria Chepurkova (RUS). i-swimmer.ru

1980 births
Living people
Olympic swimmers of Russia
Swimmers at the 2000 Summer Olympics
Russian female freestyle swimmers